Manuel Vera Vázquez (born 13 October 1962) is a Spanish rower who participated in the 1980, 1984, and 1988 Summer Olympics.

Vera was born in Seville. He participated in the 1980 Olympic Games in Moscow where he came in fifth place in the quad scull. At the 1984 Summer Olympics he came in sixth position in the quad scull. At the 1988 Olympic Games in Seoul, he came in seventh place in the double sculls.

Notes

References

External links 
 
 
 
 

1962 births
Living people
Spanish male rowers
Olympic rowers of Spain
Rowers at the 1980 Summer Olympics
Rowers at the 1984 Summer Olympics
Rowers at the 1988 Summer Olympics
Sportspeople from Seville